Irlam was a West Indiaman launched in Liverpool in 1813 for Barton & Co., which had lost an earlier  in 1812. The current Irlam was of the same burthen as her predecessor, and was employed in the same trade, Liverpool to Barbados. She was wrecked in January 1824.

Career
Irlam entered Lloyd's Register in 1813 with Rodger Hall, master, Barton and Company who were the owners, and traded from Liverpool to Barbados. She had entered service by June. The ship was fitted with a "Liverpool Patent Binnacle and Compass" manufactured by Egerton, Smith & Co Ltd, Liverpool.

She was carrying a cargo of coffee and sugar. On 9 December 1816 Irlam, Irlam master, arrived at Liverpool from Barbados. As she was coming up to dock for repairs she struck the pier and her anchor drove through her bows with the result that she ended up with four feet of water in her hold. 

Irlam having returned from another voyage from Barbados was driven ashore on 6 July 1817 at Liverpool. In April/May 1819, Irlam sailed from Barbados to Liverpool in 30 days.

Loss
Her passengers and crew were rescued. She was on a voyage from Liverpool to Barbados. The announcement of her loss stated that "should the weather prove favourable, the Ships materials may be saved".

Post script
Barton & Co. promptly proceeded to launch a third , which sailed on the same route and which met with a similar fate, being wrecked in a hurricane at Barbados on 11 August 1831.

Notes

Citations

1813 ships
Age of Sail merchant ships of England
Maritime incidents in 1817
Maritime incidents in January 1824
Ships built in England
Full-rigged ships